Rajashekhar Basavaraj Patil is an Indian politician who is the current Member of the Karnataka Legislative Assembly for Humnabad Assembly constituency since 2008.

Positions held 
2008 - MLA Humnabad  Vidhana Sabha  constituency as INC candidate.
2013 - MLA Humnabad  Vidhana Sabha  constituency as INC candidate.
2018 - MLA Humanabad Vidhana Sabha constituency as INC candidate.
2018 - Minister Mines and Zoology from Commerce and Industries Department in INC-JDS  coalition government.

References

Living people
Indian National Congress politicians from Karnataka
1965 births
Karnataka MLAs 2008–2013
Karnataka MLAs 2013–2018
Karnataka MLAs 2018–2023